This list of Ivy League law schools outlines the five universities of the Ivy League that host a law school. The three Ivy League universities that do not offer law degrees are Brown, Dartmouth and Princeton. All five Ivy League law schools are consistently ranked among the top 14 law schools in the nation or T14.

List

References

Law schools in the United States